Stringtown is an unincorporated community in Washington Township, Ripley County, in the U.S. state of Indiana.

History
A post office was established at Stringtown in 1848, and remained in operation until it was discontinued in 1865.

Geography

References

Unincorporated communities in Ripley County, Indiana
Unincorporated communities in Indiana